James Webster Jr. (born August 27, 1950) is a former American football player and coach. He served as the head football coach at Tennessee State University from 2005 to 2009, compiling a record of 25–31.

Head coaching record

References

1950 births
Living people
American football linebackers
Colorado Buffaloes football coaches
Dartmouth Big Green football coaches
East Carolina Pirates football coaches
Florida Gators football coaches
Kansas Jayhawks football coaches
North Carolina Tar Heels football coaches
North Carolina Tar Heels football players
Northwestern Wildcats football coaches
Tennessee State Tigers football coaches
Wake Forest Demon Deacons football coaches